Millard Fleming "Dixie" Howell (November 24, 1912 – March 2, 1971) was an American football and baseball player and coach. He played college football as a halfback at the University of Alabama from 1932 to 1934 and with the Washington Redskins of the National Football League (NFL) in 1937. Howell served as the head football coach at Arizona State Teachers College at Tempe, now Arizona State University, from 1938 to 1941 and at the University of Idaho from 1947 to 1950, compiling a career coaching record of 36–35–5 in college football. He also coached at the National Autonomous University of Mexico in 1935. Howell was inducted into the College Football Hall of Fame as a player in 1970. He also played professional baseball in eight minor league seasons following college.

Playing career

Football
Born in Hartford, Alabama, Howell graduated from Geneva County High School in Hartford and played college football as an undersized quadruple-threat back at Alabama from 1932 to 1934. As a senior, the Crimson Tide ran the Notre Dame Box offense, and he was a consensus All-American in 1934, as well as one of the nation's top punters. The 1934 Alabama team had two future legends as ends: Don Hutson and Bear Bryant. The Crimson Tide posted a 10–0 record, and defeated previously unbeaten Stanford 29-13 in the Rose Bowl on New Year's Day, 1935. Howell threw two touchdown passes to Hutson and ran for two more; he is a member of the all-time Rose Bowl team.

In 1937, Howell briefly played professional football in the National Football League (NFL) for the Washington Redskins, who had just relocated from Boston. The Redskins had lost the NFL championship game in 1936 to Green Bay, but returned to the title game in 1937 and defeated the Chicago Bears at Wrigley Field. Howell was a reserve quarterback for the Redskins, behind starter Sammy Baugh. He became a collegiate head coach in 1938 and ended his football playing career.

Baseball
Howell also played baseball for the Crimson Tide and originally indicated he would finish out the college baseball season in 1935 and turn pro that June. Plans changed and he signed a professional baseball contract with the Detroit Tigers
in early March and played minor league baseball through 1942.

A month after signing, he was hospitalized after being struck in the head by a foul line drive; it occurred during batting practice before an April exhibition game in Virginia, off the bat of Johnny Mize. In 1936 he played with Portland in the Pacific Coast League, then was moved to Toledo in the American Association. His career tailed off and he spent the rest of his baseball career in lower leagues. After service in the U.S. Navy during World War II, he did not return as a player and became the head coach at Alabama in January 1946 and resigned in March 1947 to become head football coach at Idaho.

Coaching career
While pursuing his baseball career, Howell coached football in his autumn off-seasons; in Mexico City in 1935 with the American football team of the National Autonomous University of Mexico and as an assistant at Loyola University in New Orleans in 1936.

Following a season in the NFL in 1937, he was hired as head coach at the Arizona State Teachers College in Tempe, and stayed for four seasons (1938–1941) with the Bulldogs, with two conference titles and two appearances in the Sun Bowl. He was a finalist for the open job at Idaho in 1941 to succeed Ted Bank, which went to Francis Schmidt, then resigned his position at Tempe in the spring of 1942 and joined the U.S. Navy as a physical training instructor for naval aviators. He served until his discharge as a lieutenant commander in November 1945, then returned to Tuscaloosa in January 1946 as an assistant football coach (backs) and head baseball coach for the Crimson Tide.

Howell was hired as head football coach at Idaho of the Pacific Coast Conference in February 1947, and guided the usually-struggling Vandals to a promising 4–4 record in his first season in Moscow, Idaho's best since 1938. The Vandals beat Stanford on the road, a team that had defeated them 45–0 the previous year (but went winless in 1947). It was Idaho's second-ever football victory over a PCC team from California, following a victory over first-year UCLA in 1928. The Vandals also knocked off an undefeated Utah in the season finale in Boise. The Vandals drew a Palouse and state record crowd to Neale Stadium for their annual rivalry game with Washington State in October, albeit a close 7–0 loss to the Cougars. These promising factors earned Howell a two-year contract extension through 1950. Idaho played Washington State close at Rogers Field in Pullman and gave Oregon a scare in Moscow. The Webfoots, with Norm Van Brocklin and John McKay, went 7–0 in conference and were co-champions with California.

Howell's relationship with Idaho fans and the administration was strained following the 1949 season. Their two non-conference wins were against overmatched opponents Willamette and Portland, and the Vandals were severely outscored  in their five losses, capped by a  loss at Stanford to end the season. Howell felt compelled to publicly deny rumors in April that he would leave before the 1950 season.

The Vandals posted a 3–5–1 record in 1950 and 1–1–1 in conference, and Howell's contract was not renewed in March 1951. Assistant coach Babe Curfman succeeded him, after leading the team through its spring drills on an interim basis.

While Howell was the head coach, the Idaho Vandals wore red jerseys.

In media
Howell had an uncredited role in the 1936 movie, The Adventures of Frank Merriwell as a football player. In the book To Kill a Mockingbird chapter 11, Scout, in an attempt to cheer up her brother, tells him he resembles Dixie Howell.

Howell is also mentioned in Randy Newman's song "My Daddy Knew Dixie Howell" from the album Good Old Boys.

After coaching
Howell got out of coaching and later worked in the Los Angeles area in sales and public relations. He had two operations for intestinal cancer in 1969 and 1971 and died at Hollywood Presbyterian Hospital in March 1971 at age 58. and was buried in Alabama in his hometown of Hartford. His wife, former actress Peggy Watters Howell (1914–2006), outlived him by 35 years and is buried beside him.

Weeks after his death, Alabama created an award in his name, given to the outstanding player of the annual spring game.

Head coaching record

Football

References

External links
 
 
 
 
 

1912 births
1971 deaths
American football halfbacks
Alabama Crimson Tide baseball coaches
Alabama Crimson Tide baseball players
Alabama Crimson Tide football coaches
Alabama Crimson Tide football players
Arizona State Sun Devils football coaches
Furman Paladins baseball coaches
Furman Paladins football coaches
Idaho Vandals football coaches
Loyola Wolf Pack football coaches
Portland Beavers players
Toledo Mud Hens players
Washington Redskins players
All-American college football players
College Football Hall of Fame inductees
United States Navy personnel of World War II
United States Navy officers
People from Hartford, Alabama
Players of American football from Alabama